Hella Heyman (also credited as Hella Hamon) (July 15, 1921 - May 1, 1992) is a cinematographer and actress, known for At Land (1944), Ritual in Transfigured Time (1946) and Invocation: Maya Deren (1987).

Life
Heyman, married to director and cinematographer Alexander Hammid his divorced in 1948 with Maya Deren. Together they had shot At Land for Maya Deren.

Filmography
as cinematographer
At Land (1944)
Ritual in Transfigured Time (1946)

as actress
At Land (1944)

as self
Invocation: Maya Deren (1987)

References

External links

1921 births
1992 deaths
American women cinematographers
American cinematographers
American film actresses